Lloydminster Hospital is a community hospital in the border community of Lloydminster, Saskatchewan, Canada. The hospital is operated by the Saskatchewan Health Authority, and also serves the Alberta community under contract to Alberta Health Services.

References

External links
Prairie North Health Region
Alberta Health Services Web Page

Buildings and structures in Lloydminster
Hospitals in Saskatchewan
Hospitals in Alberta
Heliports in Canada
Certified airports in Saskatchewan